Louis Marie Olivier Duchesne (13 September 1843 – 21 April 1922) was a French priest, philologist, teacher and a critical historian of Christianity and Roman Catholic liturgy and institutions.

Life

Descended from a family of Breton sailors, he was born on 13 September 1843 in Saint-Servan, Place Roulais, now part of Saint-Malo on the Breton coast, and was orphaned in 1849, after the death of his father Jacques Duchesne.  Louis' brother, Jean-Baptiste Duchesne, settled in Oregon City, Oregon in 1849.

Louis Duchesne was ordained to the priesthood in 1867. He taught in Saint-Brieuc, then in 1868, went to study at the École pratique des Hautes Études in Paris. From 1873 to 1876, he was a student at the École française in Rome. He was an amateur archaeologist and organized expeditions from Rome to Mount Athos, to Syria, and Asia Minor, from which he gained an interest in the early history of the Roman Catholic Church.

In 1877, he obtained the chair of ecclesiastical history of the Catholic Institute, but left the theological faculty in 1883. He then taught at the École Pratique des Hautes Études, where he influenced Alfred Firmin Loisy, a founder of the movement of Modernism, which was formally condemned under Pope Pius X. In 1895, he was appointed director of the École française.

In 1887, he published the results of his thesis, followed by the first complete critical edition of the Liber Pontificalis. At a difficult time for critical historians applying modern methods to Church history, drawing together archaeology and topography to supplement literature and setting ecclesiastical events with contexts of social history, Abbé Duchesne was in constant correspondence with like-minded historians among the Bollandists, with their long history of critical editions of hagiographies. He gained fame as a demythologizing critical historian of the popular, pious lives of saints produced by Second Empire publishers.

In 1888, he became a member of the Académie des inscriptions et belles-lettres, and in 1910, he was elected to the Académie française. Abbe Duchesne was made an apostolic prothonotary in 1900.

As editor of the Bulletin critique du littérature, d'histoire et de théologie, Duchesne kept up with current intellectual developments.

He also wrote Les Sources du martyrologe hyéronimien, Origines du culte chrétien (translated as Christian Worship: Its Origin and Evolution and often reprinted), Fastes épiscopaux de l'ancienne Gaule, and Les Premiers temps de l'État pontifical. These works were universally praised, and he was appointed a commander of the Legion of Honor. However, his Histoire ancienne de l'Église, 1906‑11 (translated as Early History of the Christian Church) was considered too modernist by the Church during the "Modernist crisis" and was placed on the Index of Forbidden Books in 1912.

The London Tablet said,By his rigid application of scientific methods of research and judgment, by his caustic tongue and pen, Mgr. Duchesne was regarded by some as a scoffer and a vandal among pious traditions. But by those who knew him, he was regarded as a master of the sciences which are auxiliary to ecclesiastical history.

He died in 1922, in Rome, and is buried in the cemetery of Saint-Servan.

Works 
 Mémoire sur une mission au mont Athos (Paris: E. Thorin, 1876)
 Les Nouveaux textes de Saint Clément de Rome, 1877
 De codicibus MSS Graecis Pii II in bibliotheca Alexandrino-Vaticana, Paris 1880
 Origines du culte chrétien: etude sur la liturgie latine avant Charlemagne (1889)
 . Next printing 1919 and 1931 (5th ed.) also in New York : Macmillan Company.
 
 second edition (in French)
  Vol. III
 second edition (in French)
 second edition (in French)
  - commemorating the 50th anniversary of the death of Louis Duchesne.

Gallery

Notes

References

Joassart, B., editor  2002. [122 letters between Duchesne and the Bollandists]
Waché, Brigitte (1975). Monseigneur Duchesne et son temps Rome: École française de Rome.
Waché, Brigitte (1992). Monseigneur Louis Duchesne (1843–1922) Rome: École française de Rome.

External links

Table of "Personalities and interpreters of the modernist movement" in the Roman Catholic Church

1843 births
1922 deaths
Writers from Saint-Malo
French philologists
19th-century French historians
20th-century French historians
Historians of the Catholic Church
Liturgists
French medievalists
Members of the Académie Française
Members of the Académie des Inscriptions et Belles-Lettres
19th-century French Roman Catholic priests
Commandeurs of the Légion d'honneur
20th-century French Roman Catholic priests
École pratique des hautes études alumni
Academic staff of the École pratique des hautes études
Modernism in the Catholic Church
Corresponding Fellows of the British Academy
Clergy from Saint-Malo